Boris Mikhaylovich Zaytsev (23 March 1937 – 24 February 2000) was a Soviet ice hockey goaltender who competed in the 1964 Winter Olympics.  He was born in Moscow, Soviet Union.

In 1964 he won the gold medal as member of the Soviet team in the Olympic tournament.

Zaytsev played for HC Dynamo Moscow in the Soviet Hockey League.  He was inducted into the Russian and Soviet Hockey Hall of Fame in 1964.

External links
 
Russian and Soviet Hockey Hall of Fame bio

1937 births
2000 deaths
Burials in Troyekurovskoye Cemetery
HC Dynamo Moscow players
Ice hockey people from Moscow
Ice hockey players at the 1964 Winter Olympics
Medalists at the 1964 Winter Olympics
Olympic gold medalists for the Soviet Union
Olympic ice hockey players of the Soviet Union
Olympic medalists in ice hockey